Thomas Peter Thorvald Kristian Ferdinand Mortensen (August 16, 1882 – April 25, 1998), known as Christian Mortensen, was a Danish-American supercentenarian, who resided in California, United States. When he died, his age of 115 years and 252 days was the longest verified male lifespan at the time, until Jiroemon Kimura surpassed him in 2012.

Besides his baptismal record, other records include the 1890 and 1901 census enumerations in Denmark, and church confirmation in 1896.

Biography 
Christian Mortensen was born to tailor Jens Karl Martinus Mortensen and his wife Maren Therkelsen Thybo in the village of Skårup in Fruering parish near the city of Skanderborg, Denmark, on August 16, 1882. He began work as a tailor's apprentice in Skanderborg at age 16, in 1898, and later took work as a farmhand.

Mortensen emigrated to Ellis Island in the New York Bay area, the United States in 1903, then aged about 20 or 21 years old. He traveled while working as a tailor, but settled in Chicago, where he had relatives. Mortensen worked various trades, including as a milkman for Borden Dairy Company, as a restaurateur, and as a factory worker for the Continental Can Company.

He was married for less than ten years, divorced and had no children. He did not remarry.

In 1950, Mortensen retired near Galveston Bay, Texas. Then, 28 years later at the age of 96, he moved to a retirement home in San Rafael, California. Mortensen claimed he rode his bicycle to the Aldersly Retirement Community, telling the staff that he was there to stay. Mortensen lived at Aldersly for almost 20 years until his death in 1998.

Mortensen was visited by American scientist James Vaupel and other longevity researchers on the occasion of his 113th birthday. He was particularly pleased with a box of Danish cigars that the researchers had brought him. Mortensen enjoyed an occasional cigar and insisted that smoking in moderation was not unhealthy. Mortensen preferred a vegetarian diet. He also drank boiled water. Mortensen was legally blind towards the end of his life and spent much of his time in a wheelchair listening to the radio. Toward the end of his life, his memory of distant events was good, but he could not remember recent events and increasingly needed assistance from staff.

On his 115th birthday, Mortensen gave his advice for a long life: "Friends, a good cigar, drinking lots of good water, no alcohol, staying positive and lots of singing will keep you alive for a long time".

See also 
 Oldest people
 List of the oldest people by country
 List of the verified oldest people
 List of supercentenarians in the Nordic countries
 List of Danish supercentenarians
 Shigechiyo Izumi, considered oldest male ever until 2011
 Jiroemon Kimura, oldest verified male in history since 2012

References

External links 
 Obituaries: Dagbladet  and Aftonbladet 

1882 births
1998 deaths
American supercentenarians
Danish emigrants to the United States
Men supercentenarians
People from San Rafael, California
People from Skanderborg Municipality